Sanhe is a town under the administration of Renhuai City in northern Guizhou, People's Republic of China, located  north-northwest of downtown Renhuai and  east of the border with Sichuan. , it has one residential community and 8 villages under its administration.

References

Towns in Guizhou
Renhuai